() is a 1956 Japanese film directed by Ishirō Honda. Wakai ki is about a  young girl who moves to Tokyo and endures the rivalries between other high school girls of varying cultural and economic backgrounds.

Release
Wakai ki was released in Japan on January 22, 1956. Any release in the United States is undetermined.

References

Footnotes

Sources

External links
 

1956 films
Films directed by Ishirō Honda
Films with screenplays by Ichirô Ikeda
Toho films
1950s Japanese films
Japanese drama films
1956 drama films
Japanese black-and-white films